39th Division, 39th Infantry Division or 39th Infantry may refer to:

Infantry divisions
 39th Division (German Empire), a unit of the Imperial German Army
 39th Reserve Division (German Empire) – later 39th Bavarian Reserve Division, a unit of the Bavarian and Imperial German Armies
 39th Infantry Division (Wehrmacht), a unit of the Germany Army during World War II
 39th Infantry Division (British India), a unit of the British Army of India
 39th Division (Imperial Japanese Army), a unit of the Imperial Japanese Army
 39th Infantry Division (Poland), a unit of the Polish Army
 39th Guards Rifle Division, a unit of the Soviet Army
 39th Rifle Division (Soviet Union), a unit of the Soviet Army
 39th Division (United Kingdom), a unit of the United Kingdom Army
 39th Infantry Division (United States), a unit of the United States Army

Armoured divisions
 39th Tank Division (Soviet Union), a unit of the Soviet Army

Aviation divisions
 39th Air Division (United States), a unit of the United States Army

Politics and government
 Room 39, also called "Division 39", a slush fund allegedly operated by the North Korean government

See also
 39th Brigade (disambiguation)
 39th Regiment (disambiguation)
 39th Battalion (disambiguation)
 39th Squadron (disambiguation)